(June 20, 1907 – July 27, 1982) was a Japanese film director and screenwriter best known for his Japanese horror films (J-Horror).

Filmography

Assistant director 

 The Captain's Daughter (1936)

Director 

 Kuroobi Arashi (1953)
 The Ghost Cat of Ouma Crossing (1954)
 Tanuki Battle of Awaodori Festival (1954)
 The Magistrate (1955)
 The Iroha Elegy (1955)
 The Magical Warrior (1955)
 Thief and Magistrate (1955)
 Ghost-Cat of Gojusan-Tsugi (1956)
 Suzunosuke Akado (1957)
 Suzunosuke Akado: The Moonlight Monster (1957)
 Nuregami kenpō (1958)
 Hitohada Jumon (1960)
 Yokaden (1960)
 The Lightning Sword (1962)
 Ghost Story of Devil’s Fire Swamp (1963)

References

External links 

 

1907 births
1982 deaths
Japanese film directors
Horror film directors